Siedlisko may refer to the following places:
Siedlisko, Greater Poland Voivodeship (west-central Poland)
Siedlisko, Łódź Voivodeship (central Poland)
Siedlisko, Lublin Voivodeship (east Poland)
Siedlisko, Krosno Odrzańskie County in Lubusz Voivodeship (west Poland)
Siedlisko, Nowa Sól County in Lubusz Voivodeship (west Poland)
Siedlisko, Elbląg County in Warmian-Masurian Voivodeship (north Poland)
Siedlisko, Gołdap County in Warmian-Masurian Voivodeship (north Poland)